Pipers may refer to:

People who play the bagpipes

Places
 Pipers, California, a former settlement in the United States
 Pipers River, a river in Tasmania, Australia
Pipers River, Tasmania, a township in Tasmania, Australia
Pipers Island, island in the River Thames at Reading, England
Pipers Creek (Seattle), stream in Seattle, Washington, United States
Pipers Cove, community on Cape Breton Island, Nova Scotia, Canada
Pipers Pool, a hamlet in Cornwall, England

Standing stones
The Pipers standing stones associated with the Hurlers stone circles, Minions, Cornwall, England
The Pipers, St Buryan, standing stones associated with the Merry Maidens stone circle, St Buryan, Cornwall, England

See also

Piper (disambiguation)